Patrick Alan Clifford (born 31 August 1946) is an Irish professional darts player who played in British Darts Organisation (BDO) events of the 1970s.

Career
Clifford made his debut of the WDF World Cup in 1977 in team are Seamus O'Brien, Jim McQuillan and Charles Byrne to Republic of Ireland. In 1977 Clifford who losing to Eric Bristow from England.

Clifford made one BDO World Darts Championship appearance in 1978 losing 6–0 to Rab Smith from Scotland. In 1977 he progressed to the second round of the Winmau World Masters he losing 3–0 to Louis van Iseghem from Belgium.

Clifford left the BDO in 1978.

World Championship results

BDO
 1978: 1st round (lost to Rab Smith 0–6) (legs)

External links
Profile at Darts Database
Profile at Dartsmad

Irish darts players
British Darts Organisation players
Living people
1946 births